The 2014–15 Cypriot Third Division was the 44th season of the Cypriot third-level football league. THOI Lakatamia won their 3rd title.

Format
Fourteen teams participated in the 2014–15 Cypriot Third Division. All teams played against each other twice, once at their home and once away. The team with the most points at the end of the season crowned champions. The first three teams were promoted to the 2015–16 Cypriot Second Division and the last team was relegated to the 2015–16 Cypriot Fourth Division.

Point system
Teams received three points for a win, one point for a draw and zero points for a loss.

Changes from previous season
Teams promoted to 2014–15 Cypriot Second Division
 Elpida Xylofagou
 ENAD Polis Chrysochous

Teams relegated from 2013–14 Cypriot Second Division
 PAEEK FC 
 ASIL Lysi
 Chalkanoras Idaliou
 Onisilos Sotira1

1Onisillos Sotira were dissolved after the end of the 2013–14 season due to financial problems.

Teams promoted from 2013–14 Cypriot Fourth Division
 Enosi Neon Ypsona1
 Amathus Ayiou Tychona

1Enosi Neon Ypsona merged with Digenis Akritas Ipsona to form ENY-Digenis Ipsona.

Teams relegated to 2014–15 Cypriot Fourth Division
 Spartakos Kitiou
 Adonis Idaliou
 Konstantios & Evripidis Trachoniou

Stadia and locations

League standings

Results

Sources

See also
 Cypriot Third Division
 2014–15 Cypriot First Division
 2014–15 Cypriot Cup for lower divisions

Cypriot Third Division seasons
Cyprus
2014–15 in Cypriot football